Santosh Kumar   is an Indian politician and Member of Parliament representing the Purnia constituency in Bihar. He was first elected in the 2014 Indian general election, having run as the Janata Dal (United) candidate in the constituency. In 2010 he was also elected as Member of Legislative assembly of the Baisi (Vidhan Sabha constituency) of Purnea district as a Bharatiya Janata Party candidate. One month before 2014 lok sabha election he  joined JD(U) as he was nominated as the party candidate  for Lok Sabha election for Purnea constituency.

Life and political career
Born to Nevilal Vishwash and Ramsakhi Devi in 1976, Santosh's education was completed in Purnea from Surya Narayan Singh college, Rambagh. He has been an agriculturist and social worker before starting his career as a full-time politician. He has been an MLA of Baisi, Purnea Bihar before being elected as Member of Parliament in 2014. Further, he has been associated  with various  important committees of the Parliament  and important posts within Janata Dal (United).  He has served as  Member  of  Standing Committee on Personnel, Public Grievances,  Law and Justice, Committee on Private Members` Bills and Resolutions, Member of Consultative Committee, Ministry of Coal,
Member  of  Standing Committee on Petroleum and Natural Gas, Member, Committee on Welfare of Other Backward Classes, Member, Standing Committee on Petroleum and Natural Gas and Member of  Rules Committee.

In 2019, he was re-elected as Member of Parliament from Purnea Lok Sabha constituency for a second  term. He is a follower of Ram Manohar Lohia's ideology. He defeated  Uday Singh Pappu in 2019 Lok Sabha elections with a large margin of over 2.5 Lakh votes. In 2019, Santosh was one of the nominee of Janata Dal (United) for ministerial post in new Narendra Modi ministry. However, JD(U) later decided  not to claim ministerial birth due to less number of seats allotted to its members as ministers.

Controversies

2016 Awadhesh Mandal escape incident 
Kushwaha was allegedly involved in helping Awadhesh Mandal, the husband of Janata Dal (United) Member of Legislative Assembly, Beema Bharti to escape from police custody in Purnia. Mandal, a gangster, who was wanted in over hundred criminal cases, was also accused of being involved in a murder 
case, in connection with which, he subsequently threatened the widow of the deceased. After he was caught by the Police and taken to a police station in Purnia, Beema Bharti accompanied by Santosh Kushwaha and over hundred of supporters reached the police station. It was alleged that while Kushwaha was engaged in conversation with the police officials, Bharti helped her husband to escape in her SUV.

See also
 List of members of the 16th Lok Sabha
 List of members of the 17th Lok Sabha

References

India MPs 2014–2019
Lok Sabha members from Bihar
Janata Dal (United) politicians
Living people
1976 births
India MPs 2019–present